Compsoctena ostracitis is a moth in the family Eriocottidae. It was described by Edward Meyrick in 1913. It is found in South Africa.

The wingspan is about 16 mm. The forewings are ochreous whitish with the costal edge blackish at the base. The hindwings are light grey.

References

Endemic moths of South Africa
Moths described in 1913
Compsoctena
Lepidoptera of South Africa